National Highway 148BB, commonly referred to as NH 148BB is a national highway in  India. It is a spur road of National Highway 48 in the state of Punjab in India.

Route 
Jakhal, Lehragaga, Chhajli, Sunam.

Junctions  

  near Jakhal

See also 
 List of National Highways in India
 List of National Highways in Punjab, India
 List of National Highways in India by state

References

External links 

 NH 148BB on OpenStreetMap

National highways in India
National Highways in Punjab, India